Amul Voice of India – Mummy Ke Superstars is an Indian television talent show for child singers on the Star Plus channel. A feature of the show is that all of the contestants are accompanied by their mothers. The show is hosted by Akriti Kakkar and Ali Asgar, with Shubha Mudgal, Vishal Dadlani and Shekhar Ravjiani as judges.

References

Indian reality television series
Singing talent shows
2009 Indian television series debuts
2009 Indian television series endings
Indian music television series
Indian television spin-offs